Richard (Dic) James Doyle,  (March 10, 1923 – April 9, 2003) was a Canadian journalist, editor, and Senator.

Born in Toronto, Ontario, he served in the Royal Canadian Air Force during World War II, and retired in 1945 with the rank of Flying Officer.

He joined The Globe and Mail in 1951, becoming editor in 1963 and Editor-in-chief in 1978. He was succeeded by Norman Webster in 1983.

He is the author of two books: The Royal Story and Hurly-Burly: A Time at the Globe.

He was appointed to the Senate in 1985 representing the senatorial division of North York, Ontario and sat as a Progressive Conservative until his mandatory retirement when he turned 75.

In 1983, he was made an Officer of the Order of Canada. He was made a member of the Canadian News Hall of Fame in 1990.

References

External links

1923 births
2003 deaths
Canadian newspaper editors
Canadian male journalists
Journalists from Toronto
Members of the United Church of Canada
Politicians from Toronto
Progressive Conservative Party of Canada senators
Officers of the Order of Canada
Canadian senators from Ontario
The Globe and Mail editors
Royal Canadian Air Force personnel of World War II
Royal Canadian Air Force officers